Sheary is a surname. Notable people with the surname include:

 Conor Sheary (born 1992), American ice hockey player
 Buster Sheary (1908–2001), American basketball coach

See also
 Sherry (name)